Geetha Madhuri is an Indian playback singer and voice artist. Madhuri has sung over 1800 songs in several languages including Telugu, Tamil, Kannada and Malayalam. She is a recepeint of numerous Nandi Awards and Filmfare awards.

Personal life 
Madhuri was born to Prabhakar Sastry, a State Bank of India official, and Lakshmi. Madhuri is their only daughter. Her family moved from Palakollu, West Godavari District to Hyderabad when she was very young.

Madhuri was schooled at Loyala Model High School, Vanasthalipuram and Little Flower Junior College. She graduated in B Com at Aurora College. She was trained in classical and light music by Kocharlakota Padmavati and Ramachari. Madhuri made her debut as a playback singer with Kulasekhar's film Premalekha Rasa.

Madhuri married actor Nandu in 2014. The couple have a daughter born in 2019 named Dakshayani Prakruthi.

Awards and nominations

Other Awards
 Swara Saraswathi Award from Andhra Pradesh

Discography

Devotional songs

Independent songs

References

External links

Living people
Nandi Award winners
Filmfare Awards South winners
Indian women playback singers
Singers from Andhra Pradesh
Telugu playback singers
Indian voice actresses
Film musicians from Andhra Pradesh
21st-century Indian singers
People from West Godavari district
Women musicians from Andhra Pradesh
21st-century Indian women singers
People from Palakollu
Indian folk-pop singers
Bigg Boss (Telugu TV series) contestants
1989 births
Santosham Film Awards winners
South Indian International Movie Awards winners
CineMAA Awards winners